Luis Armando Checa Villamar (born December 21, 1983) is an Ecuadorian retired footballer who last time played with CD Clan Juvenil.

Club career
Luis started out at Deportivo Quito where he had a first good season. He had 27 appearances to start out with and attracted last season's champions El Nacional.

In 2007, Luis was awarded a move to Nacional by his impressive defending performances. However, he only had two appearances and former Nacional coach, Ever Hugo Almeida, was not interested in keeping him with the Quito giants. He finished the year playing on loan for Aucas. In 2008, he went back to Deportivo Quito and is still there currently. In December 2008, he helped Deportivo Quito win their third title in history.

Copa Sudamericana 2008
Luis helped Dep. Quito qualify for the Copa Sudamericana 2008. He made four appearances and was an important player for Sevilla's team. His team went on to eliminate Universitario de Deportes of Peru in a 2-1 aggregate win. Deportivo Quito then had to play Mexico's San Luis. Unfortunately, Deportivo Quito was eliminated from the tournament in a 5-4 aggregate loss. He scored one of the goals for Deportivo Quito.

International career
Luis has been called up to a friendly against Mexico on November 12, 2008. He is expected to be in the starting line-up for Ecuador. He was recently called up to play a quadrangular friendly tournament in Oman.

References

External links
 
 

1983 births
Living people
Footballers from Quito
Association football central defenders
Ecuadorian footballers
Ecuador international footballers
2011 Copa América players
Ecuadorian Serie A players
C.D. El Nacional footballers
S.D. Quito footballers
S.D. Aucas footballers
Barcelona S.C. footballers